Sir Gabriel Prior Goldney, 2nd Baronet,  (4 August 1843 – 4 May 1925) was the first son of Gabriel Goldney, Conservative MP for Chippenham. The title passed to him in 1900 on the death of his father.

Career
Goldney studied at Exeter College, Oxford and qualified as a barrister of the Inner Temple.
He was appointed as a Royal Commissioner for the Norwich Election Enquiry of 1875 to investigate alleged corruption, and the following year, Recorder of Helstone. In 1879 he was appointed Recorder of Poole, resigning from that position in 1882.

Other appointments included Remembrancer for the City of London in 1882, J.P. for Wiltshire and Deputy Lieutenant for the City of London in 1894. He was appointed High Sheriff of Wiltshire in 1906. He also held the rank of Major in the Royal Wiltshire Yeomanry. He was an active Freemason and was also appointed a Companion of the Order of the Bath (CB) in July 1902 and a Commander of the Royal Victorian Order (CVO) in the 1904 New Year Honours.

On his death in 1925 the baronetcy passed to his younger brother Frederick.

References

Deputy Lieutenants of the City of London
Members of the Inner Temple
Alumni of Exeter College, Oxford
Baronets in the Baronetage of the United Kingdom
Companions of the Order of the Bath
Commanders of the Royal Victorian Order
Royal Wiltshire Yeomanry officers
1843 births
1925 deaths
High Sheriffs of Wiltshire
Gabriel